El Serrat is a mountain village in the parish of Ordino, Andorra. It is a popular destination for skiers.

Geography
El Serrat is near the source of the northern branch of the Rio Valira.

Flora
Many different types of wild flowers grow in the El Serrat area.

See also
 Flora of Andorra

References

Populated places in Andorra
Ordino